86th NBR Awards
Best Film:
A Most Violent Year

The 86th National Board of Review Awards, honoring the best in film for 2014, were announced on December 2, 2014.

Top 10 Films
Films listed alphabetically except top, which is ranked as Best Film of the Year:

A Most Violent Year
American Sniper
Birdman
Boyhood
Fury
Gone Girl
The Imitation Game
Inherent Vice
The Lego Movie
Nightcrawler
Unbroken

Top Foreign Films
Force Majeure
Gett: The Trial of Viviane Amsalem
Leviathan
Two Days, One Night
We Are the Best!

Top Documentaries 
Art and Craft
Jodorowsky's Dune
Keep On Keepin' On
The Kill Team
Last Days in Vietnam

Top Independent Films 
Blue Ruin
Locke
A Most Wanted Man
Mr. Turner
Obvious Child
The Skeleton Twins
Snowpiercer
Stand Clear of the Closing Doors
Starred Up
Still Alice

Winners

Best Film:
A Most Violent Year

Best Director:
Clint Eastwood, American Sniper

Best Actor (tie):
Oscar Isaac, A Most Violent Year
Michael Keaton, Birdman

Best Actress:
Julianne Moore, Still Alice

Best Supporting Actor:
Edward Norton, Birdman

Best Supporting Actress:
Jessica Chastain, A Most Violent Year

Best Original Screenplay:
Phil Lord and Christopher Miller, The Lego Movie

Best Adapted Screenplay:
Paul Thomas Anderson, Inherent Vice

Best Animated Feature:
How to Train Your Dragon 2

Breakthrough Performance:
Jack O'Connell, Starred Up and Unbroken

Best Directorial Debut:
Gillian Robespierre, Obvious Child

Best Foreign Language Film:
Wild Tales

Best Documentary:
Life Itself

William K. Everson Film History Award:
Scott Eyman

Best Ensemble:
Fury

Spotlight Award:
Chris Rock for writing, directing, and starring Top Five.

NBR Freedom of Expression:
Rosewater
Selma

References

National Board of Review Awards
2014 film awards
2014 in American cinema